Anne Emily Bergl (born 25 April 1975) is an English actress. She is best known for her role as Rachel Lang in the supernatural horror film The Rage: Carrie 2 (1999), Annie O'Donnell on the ABC television show Men in Trees (2006–08), Beth Young on Desperate Housewives (2010–12), Tammi Bryant on the TNT drama series Southland (2009–2013) and Sammi Slott in Shameless (2014–2015). She also performs as a cabaret singer. She also played Francie in Gilmore Girls.

Early life
Bergl was born in Milton Keynes, Buckinghamshire, England, to an Irish mother and an English architect father. She has one brother. Her family emigrated to the United States when she was six, initially residing in Denver, Colorado. When she was ten, they moved to Glenview, Illinois, where she spent the remainder of her upbringing. She attended Glenbrook South High School and Grinnell College, where she was the lead in several school productions. She graduated Phi Beta Kappa in 1997 with a Bachelor of Arts degree in English and theatre. During her college years, she spent a semester (spring 1996) studying with the National Theater Institute at The Eugene O'Neill Theater Center. She received additional acting training at HB Studio in New York City.

Career

Acting
Bergl began acting in theater, appearing in a production of Romeo and Juliet opposite Neil Patrick Harris at San Diego's Old Globe Theatre in 1998. She then had the lead role of Rachel Lang in the 1999 film The Rage: Carrie 2, the sequel to the 1976 supernatural thriller Carrie.  She has appeared in episodes of the TV shows Gilmore Girls, CSI: Miami, Medium, Law & Order: Criminal Intent, NYPD Blue, and Star Trek: Enterprise. She also appeared in the psychological thriller Chasing Sleep, opposite star Jeff Daniels. She had a major role in the Steven Spielberg 2002 miniseries Taken.

Bergl had a significant co-starring role in the ABC series Men in Trees as Annie, an enthusiastic fan of the series' main character, played by Anne Heche. 

Bergl played in Becky Shaw at Second Stage Theatre in New York in the beginning of 2009. She played Paul Young's new wife, Beth, in the seventh season of Desperate Housewives.

Cabaret 
In 2010–11, Bergl performed a cabaret show called Kidding on the Square, which had a run in the summer of 2010 in Los Angeles and New York City, then later in Chicago. In September 2011, with the show in New York, The New York Times wrote of her performance:

A later article elaborated on her cabaret acts.

Personal life
Bergl's daughter, Eleanor Ruby Rósín Bergl, was born in 2017.

Filmography

Film

Television

Accolades
Bergl was nominated for two Saturn Awards by the Academy of Science Fiction, Fantasy and Horror Films: in 2000, for Best Performance by a Younger Actor/Actress for The Rage: Carrie 2 (1999); and in 2003, for Best Actress in a Television Series for Taken (2002).

References

External links
 
 
 Emily Bergl Interview by Beth Stevens on Broadway.com
 Emily's Men in Trees blog on TVGuide.com

1975 births
Living people
Actresses from Buckinghamshire
Actresses from Chicago
British emigrants to the United States
English film actresses
English people of Irish descent
English stage actresses
English television actresses
Grinnell College alumni
People from Milton Keynes
Singers from Chicago
21st-century American women singers
20th-century English actresses
21st-century English actresses
21st-century English singers
21st-century English women singers
American expatriates in England